Denis Oswald (born 9 May 1947 in Neuchâtel) is a Swiss rower and sports official. He competed in the 1968, 1972, and 1976 Summer Olympics. He is the immediate past-president of the World Rowing Federation (1989–2014).

Career
In 1968 Oswald won the bronze medal as crew member of the Swiss boat in the coxed fours event. Four years later he finished eighth with the Swiss boat in the coxed four competition. At the 1976 Games he was part of the Swiss boat which finished eighth in the quadruple sculls event.

From 1989 until July 2014 Oswald was president of the International Rowing Federation. In 1991 he was elected to the International Olympic Committee (IOC). Since 2000 he has been a member of the IOC's executive board and since 2005 he has been presiding over the IOC's coordination committee for the 2012 Summer Olympics.

2013 candidacy for IOC President
On 24 May 2013, Denis Oswald confirmed that he would run for President of the IOC. On 10 September 2013 at the 125th IOC Session in Buenos Aires, he lost the election to Thomas Bach.

He is a head of the IOC Disciplinary Commission.

In February of 2022, he was retained to represent Kamila Valieva, a Russian figure skater who tested positive for trimetazidine, a banned substance, and was temporarily suspended from the ROC Olympic team. While there are equities on both sides of the Valieva dispute, Oswald made the claim that Valieva tested positive because of contamination from medication her grandfather was taking.

References

External links

 Profile on sports-reference.com
 IOC factsheet

1947 births
Living people
Swiss male rowers
Olympic rowers of Switzerland
Rowers at the 1968 Summer Olympics
Rowers at the 1972 Summer Olympics
Rowers at the 1976 Summer Olympics
Olympic bronze medalists for Switzerland
International Olympic Committee members
Olympic medalists in rowing
Medalists at the 1968 Summer Olympics
Doping in Russia
Rowing officials
People from Neuchâtel
Sportspeople from the canton of Neuchâtel